Thomas Wilson Dibblee, Jr. (11 October 1911, in Santa Barbara, California – 17 November 2004, in Santa Barbara, California) was an American geologist best known for his geological mapping. He is also known, together with co-author Mason Hill, for the assertion in 1953 that hundreds of miles of lateral movement had taken place along the San Andreas Fault in California, an idea that was radical at the time, but which has been vindicated by later work and the modern theory of plate tectonics.

Biography
Dibblee was born in 1911, the eldest son of Thomas Dibblee Sr. and Anita Oreña Dibblee. His earliest California ancestor was Captain José de la Guerra y Noriega, the Comandante of the Presidio of Santa Barbara. Dibblee grew up on Rancho San Julian, one of the Dibblee - de la Guerra family ranches.  He became interested in geology as a boy, when he assisted a geologist who surveyed the family ranch for oil-bearing structures.

Petroleum geologist
After graduating from Stanford University in 1936, Dibblee worked briefly for the California Division of Mines, then went to work for Union Oil Company and then Richfield Oil as a field exploration petroleum geologist. His field mapping led to the discovery of the Russell Ranch Oil Field, the first oil field to be found in the Cuyama Valley in 1948, and then to the nearby larger South Cuyama Oil Field in 1949.

Dibblee was known for "roughing it" during his field mapping trips, for which he dropped out of sight for a week or two at a time.  When he submitted one expense account totaling $14.92 for one such mapping project, his Richfield Oil supervisor objected that he couldn't have even fed himself for that amount, to which Dibblee replied: "Oh, I find lots of things I like to eat up in the hills."

US Geological Survey
He joined the US Geological Survey in 1952, and was assigned to geologic mapping in the Mojave Desert.  In 1953 he and co-worker Mason Hill published a paper proposing  of lateral movement along the San Andreas Fault.  At that time, prior to plate tectonics theory, there was no known mechanism that could cause such large-scale movements.

Los Padres National Forest
Dibblee retired from the USGS in 1977, and the following year began mapping the geology of the Los Padres National Forest as a volunteer.

Family
In 1949 Dibblee married Loretta Escabosa, whom he met when she was a secretary at Richfield Oil. They had a long marriage, with no children. Loretta died in 2001.  In 2004, Dibblee died in Santa Barbara. He was 93 years old.

Awards
 US Geological Survey - Distinguished Service Award, 1967
 American Association of Petroleum Geologists - Human Needs Award, 1981
 Presidential Volunteer Action Award, 1983

Dibblee Geological Foundation
The Dibblee Geological Foundation was established to publish Dibblee's many unpublished geological maps.  In 2002 the foundation was adopted by the Santa Barbara Museum of Natural History.  The foundation continues to publish maps based on Dibblee's work.

Published works

 (with Mason L. Hill) “San Andreas, Garlock, and Big Pine faults, California,” Geological Society of America Bulletin, April 1953, p. 443-458.  This is considered a classic publication in the history of plate tectonics theory.

References

American petroleum geologists
Scientists from California
United States Geological Survey personnel
1911 births
2004 deaths
People from Santa Barbara, California
Stanford University alumni
Geology of California
Cuyama Valley
Los Padres National Forest
20th-century American geologists